Sailing/Yachting is an Olympic sport starting from the Games of the 1st Olympiad (1896 Olympics in Athens, Greece). With the exception of 1904 and the canceled 1916 Summer Olympics, sailing has always been included on the Olympic schedule. The Sailing program of 1980 consisted of a total of six sailing classes (disciplines). For each class seven races were scheduled from 19 to 29 July 1980 of the coast of Tallinn (district of Pirita, in present-day Estonia), in that time an annexed part of the USSR at the Baltic Sea. The sailing was done on the triangular type Olympic courses.

Venue

According to the IOC statutes the contests in all sport disciplines must be held either in, or as close as possible to the city which the IOC has chosen. Since Moscow was not a suitable place the Olympic Yachting Centre in Pirita Tallinn was constructed for the 1980 Olympic Sailing event.

Competition

Overview

Continents 
 Europe
 Africa
 Americas

Countries

1980 Olympic boycott
The boycott affected the medalists in most sailing events with a number of European and World champions not participating. In the Soiling, the Canadian World champion team of Glen Dexter, Andreas Josenhans and [Sandy McMillan] was absent. Some British athletes participated in the Games under a neutral flag, but the sailing federation chose to join the boycott. In several classes an alternative sailing event was organized by the boycotting nations, with the Flying Dutchman class having been held Luxembourg.

Classes (equipment)

Medal summary

Medal table

Remarks

Sailors

During the sailing regattas at the 1980 Summer Olympics among others the following persons were competing in the various classes:
 , Valentin Mankin, multi-medalist in the Star
 , Mihai Butucaru, later committee member of Eurosaf

References

Sources
 
 
 
 

 
1980 Summer Olympics events
1980
1980 in sailing
Sports competitions in Tallinn
1980 in Estonia
Sailing in Estonia
20th century in Tallinn